Ishoʿyahb I of Arzun was patriarch of the Assyrian Church of the East from 582 to 595.  His name is included in the traditional list of patriarchs of the Church of the East.

Sources 
Brief accounts of Ishoʿyahb's patriarchate are given in the Ecclesiastical Chronicle of the Jacobite writer Bar Hebraeus (floruit 1280) and in the ecclesiastical histories of the Nestorian writers Mari (twelfth-century), ʿAmr (fourteenth-century) and Sliba (fourteenth-century).  A lengthier and more circumstantial account is given in the Chronicle of Seert, an anonymous ninth-century Nestorian history.

Ishoʿyahb's patriarchate 
The following account of Ishoʿyahb's patriarchate is given by Bar Hebraeus:

The catholicus Ezekiel, who had called his bishops blind and later became blind himself, lived in the time of Hormizd, son of Khusro.  He died two years after he went blind, and was succeeded by  Ishoʿyahb, bishop of Arzun.  This man, after fulfilling his office for fifteen years, set out to visit Nuʿman, king of the Christian Arabs, to try to detach him to the Nestorian faith, as he belonged to our church, but was unable to change his mind.  He died in the tents of the Maʿadaye, and was buried in the monastery of Hind, the daughter of Nuʿman, who dressed him in a monk’s robe.  In his days two monasteries were built, Deir Saʿid near Mosul and the monastery of Mansur in the region of the Ninevites.  After Hormizd had reigned for two years, the Persians attacked him and killed him.  His son Khusro Abroes ascended the throne after him, in the year 901 [AD 589–90], and reigned for eighteen years.  During his reign the catholicus Ishoʿyahb died, and was succeeded by Sabrishoʿ, who was a native of the village of Pirozabad in the country of Beth Garmai.

See also
 List of patriarchs of the Church of the East

Notes

References
 Abbeloos, J. B., and Lamy, T. J., Bar Hebraeus, Chronicon Ecclesiasticum (3 vols, Paris, 1877)
 Assemani, J. A., De Catholicis seu Patriarchis Chaldaeorum et Nestorianorum (Rome, 1775)
 Brooks, E. W., Eliae Metropolitae Nisibeni Opus Chronologicum (Rome, 1910)
 
 Furlani, Giuseppe, "Il trattato di Yešō‘yabh d’Ārzōn sul Τρισαγιον", Rivista degli Studi Orientali 7:3 (1916-1918), p. 687-715.
 Graffin, Roger, "Le synode de Mar Jésuyab", Revue de l’Orient chrétien 4:2 (1899), p. 247-262.
 Gismondi, H., Maris, Amri, et Salibae: De Patriarchis Nestorianorum Commentaria I: Amri et Salibae Textus (Rome, 1896)
 Gismondi, H., Maris, Amri, et Salibae: De Patriarchis Nestorianorum Commentaria II: Maris textus arabicus et versio Latina (Rome, 1899).
 Vazheeparampil, Prasanna, "The Anaphoral Celebration in the Letter of Catholicos Isho'yahb I (581-595), in: Ostkirchliche Studien, 45 (1996), p. 309-338.
 Paša, Željko, "Īšū‘yāb I al-Arzunī and Confession of the Faith: Critical Edition and Translation", in Parole de l’Orient 44 (2018), p. 359-385.
 Macar, Andrei, "Das ostsyrische Mönchtum in den Kanons der Synode von Isho'yahb I aus dem Jahr 585", in Shabo Talay (Hrsg.), Überleben im Schatten. Geschichte und Kultur des Syrischen Christentums, Harrassowitz Verlag, Wiesbaden, 2020, p. 133-146.
 Macar, Andrei, „The Synod of Ishoʽyahb I from 585 A.D. and the Question of Monasticism“, in The Harp: Journal of Syriac, Oriental, and Ecumenical Studies, Vol. XXXVI (2020), S. 285-311.     
 Macar, Andrei, "Die Sonntagsfeier im ostsyrischen Christentum. Der Beitrag des Katholikos-Patriarchen Isho’yahb I.  (582-595)", in Egbert Schlarb (Hrsg.), Den Orient erforschen, mit Orthodoxen Leben. Festschrift für Martin Tamcke zum Ende seiner aktiven Dienstzeit, Harrassowitz Verlag, Wiesbaden, 2021, S. 467-478.
 Mar Awa III, "The Memra of Patriarch Mar ’Īšō‘yahb I of Arzōn (581-595): The Cause of the ‘Holy God’.", Hugoye: Journal of Syriac Studies, 25.1 (2022), 85-136.

External links 

Patriarchs of the Church of the East
6th-century bishops of the Church of the East
Christians in the Sasanian Empire